Mohamed Ibrahim Liqliqato (1921, Kismayo, Italian Somaliland – 1998) was a Somali military and political leader, worked as an ambassador, minister, speaker of the Parliament and was prominent figure of Siyad Barre's rule in Somalia.

In 1964, Liqliqato joined the Somali Army. In 1969, the military took over the government and new president Siad Barre appointed Liqliqato as Somali Ambassador to the Soviet Union (1969–1970). From 1970–1974, he served as Ambassador to West Germany. From 1974–1978, Liqliqato served as Minister of Agriculture, and from 1978–1980 as Minister of Domestic and Foreign Trade.

References

Somalian military leaders
1921 births
1998 deaths
Government ministers of Somalia
Speakers of the Parliament of Somalia
Ambassadors of Somalia to the Soviet Union
Ambassadors of Somalia to West Germany
Somali Revolutionary Socialist Party politicians
Ethnic Somali people
Somalian diplomats